Vlastimil Havlík (born 26 January 1957) is a Czech former basketball player and coach. He was voted to the Czechoslovakian 20th Century Team in 2001.

Professional career
During his club career, Havlík won six Czechoslovakian League championships (1976, 1977, 1978, 1986, 1987, and 1988). He was also named the Czechoslovakian Player of the Year, in 1986.

National team career
With the senior Czechoslovakian national team, Havlík competed in the men's tournament at the 1980 Summer Olympics. With Czechoslovakia, he also won the bronze medal at the 1981 EuroBasket, and the silver medal at the 1985 EuroBasket.

See also
Czechoslovak Basketball League career stats leaders

References

External links
 

1957 births
Living people
Basketball players at the 1980 Summer Olympics
Czech basketball coaches
Czechoslovak basketball coaches
Czech men's basketball players
Czechoslovak men's basketball players
1978 FIBA World Championship players
1982 FIBA World Championship players
Olympic basketball players of Czechoslovakia
Shooting guards
Sportspeople from Brno